Maurice Manson (born Moritz Levine, January 31, 1913 – September 21, 2002) was a Canadian character actor who appeared in several film and Broadway productions as well as numerous television appearances in a career spanning over thirty years.

Early years
Manson was born in Toronto, Ontario, to Russian Jewish immigrant parents. During World War II he was an Army medical photographer in Europe.

Career
Manson moved to New York City to become an actor and worked steadily on and off Broadway throughout the 1930s and into the 1940s. Among his credits were productions of Othello and Macbeth at the Barrymore Theater. In the 1950s, he moved to Hollywood, California, and was cast mostly in small roles. He appeared in films such as Hellcats of the Navy and The Spirit of St. Louis.

On television, he guest-starred on five episodes of the CBS legal drama, Perry Mason, starring Raymond Burr, including the role of murder victim Charles Sabin (and his brother Arthur) in "The Case of the Perjured Parrot," murder victim Joseph Kraft in "The Case of the Bogus Books," and as Jess Parkinson in "The Case of the Dead Ringer" in which Burr played dual roles as Mason and murderer Grimes. He portrayed Mayor Orson Stillman in "The Case of the Bullied Bowler" and Dr. Grandby in "The Case of Demure Defendant". He appeared five times on the NBC sitcom, Hazel, starring Shirley Booth. He also appeared on The Americans, Alfred Hitchcock Presents, Leave It To Beaver, Dennis the Menace, The Munsters, and Gunsmoke (S1E20).

Broadway roles
 Mary of Scotland (1933) as a page and as Graeme a sergeant

Film roles

References

External links

1913 births
2002 deaths
Canadian emigrants to the United States
American male film actors
American male television actors
Male actors from Toronto
Male actors from New York City
Male actors from Los Angeles
American people of Russian-Jewish descent
20th-century American male actors